Lydian may refer to:
 Lydians, an ancient people of Anatolia
 Lydian language, an ancient Anatolian language
 Lydian alphabet
 Lydian (Unicode block)
 Lydian (typeface), a decorative typeface
 Lydian dominant scale or acoustic scale, a musical scale
 Lydian mode, a mode derived from ancient Greek music

See also
 Ludian (disambiguation)
 Lydia (disambiguation)

Language and nationality disambiguation pages